Walter Tournier (born July 14, 1944) is a Uruguayan director of animated and documentary films, who is closely identified with that country's enterprising filmmaking community. His work has been well-received both at home and at film festivals in Latin America, Europe and the United States.

Career
Tournier studied architecture at the University of the Republic in Montevideo, Uruguay, but decided that his true vocation was filmmaking. He joined C3M in 1969. He produced his debut film, In the Forest There Is Much to Do, prior to C3M's dissolution in 1974 using cutout animation to tell the story of a father who tries to make his young daughter understand the reason for his incarceration as a political prisoner.

He then lived as an exile in Peru from the military dictatorship in Uruguay until 1985. There he dedicated himself to archaeology, which he studied at the National University of San Marcos in Lima. He also made several short films. During this period, he developed many of the animation techniques that he later applied with considerable success throughout his career such as the use of materials and technologies that he found locally.

Tournier founded Imagenes Studio with producer Mario Jacob in 1986, where he served as head of animation. Among other films, he directed The Hiding Places of the Sun (1990) which showed the aftermath of eleven years of dictatorship in Uruguay through the eyes of children. In addition, he made documentaries and coordinated an animation workshop that resulted in the environmental miniseries Mother Earth. In 1994 he left Imagenes to form a new company, Tournier Animation.

In 2012, following a succession of short films and television miniseries, he directed the first full-length animated picture to be made in Uruguay entitled Selkirk, the Real Robinson Crusoe, with distribution by The Walt Disney Company. The production utilized puppet animation to present the life of 18th-century Scottish sailor Alexander Selkirk. It was acclaimed by Montevideo's El País newspaper as "a visual delight that is rarely found in a movie that is not British or American."

Recognition
Tournier's work has been shown at film festivals in Latin America, Spain, France, Germany and the United States. His internationally awarded animated films include The Condor and the Fox (1980), The Disobedient Carnation (1981), Our Small Paradise (1983), Optical Illusions (1983), The Boss and the Carpenter (2000), Caribbean Christmas (2001) and In Spite of Everything (2003). In 2002 he received the Prince Claus Award from the Netherlands for his contributions to culture.

Filmography
Tournier was involved in the production of the following films:

References

External links
 "Uruguay’s Scrappy Filmmakers Impact Global Pic Scene" by Emiliano De Pablos (May 18, 2013) in Variety
 Selkirk, the Real Robinson Crusoe official movie website of Tournier Animation (2012)

1944 births
Living people
People from Montevideo
Uruguayan animators
Uruguayan film directors
Uruguayan film producers
Uruguayan animated film directors
Uruguayan animated film producers
Uruguayan people of French descent
Uruguayan screenwriters